Tomas Gunnar Tobé (born 16 February 1978) is a Swedish politician and who has been serving as a Member of the European Parliament since the 2019 European Parliament election in Sweden. He was the party secretary of the Moderate Party from 10 January 2015 to 2 June 2017.

Political career

Career in national politics
Tobé was elected to the Swedish Riksdag in the 2006 general election. During his parliament, he served as chair of its Committee on Employment from 2010 to 2012; the Committee on Education from 2012 to 2014; and the Committee on Legal Affairs from 2018 to 2019. He was mentioned as possible successor for the party leadership after Fredrik Reinfeldt, but declined and supported Anna Kinberg Batra.

In March 2017 there was controversy around Tobé after it was revealed that he had used public funds for wine purchases and personal trips. On 2 June 2017, he was removed from his position as party secretary by party leader Anna Kinberg Batra and appointed Shadow Minister for Justice and Chairman of the Parliament's Committee on Justice.

Member of the European Parliament
Since the 2019 European Parliament election, Tobé has been serving as chairman of the Committee on Development. In this capacity, he co-chairs (alongside David McAllister) the Democracy Support and Election Coordination Group (DEG), which oversees the Parliament’s election observation missions.

Tobé is also a member of the Committee on Civil Liberties, Justice and Home Affairs. On the committee, he has been serving as rapporteur on asylum and migration since 2020.

In addition to his committee assignments, Tobé is part of the Parliament’s delegations for relations to Israel and to the Parliamentary Assembly of the Union for the Mediterranean. He also belongs to the European Parliament Intergroup on LGBT Rights and the European Parliament Intergroup on Children’s Rights.

After the 2022 Russian invasion of Ukraine, Tobé supported Swedish membership in NATO.

Personal life
Tobé is married to Markus Tobé with whom he has twins born via surrogacy.

References

External links 
Tomas Tobé – www.moderat.se

Members of the Riksdag from the Moderate Party
Living people
1978 births
Swedish LGBT politicians
Gay politicians
People from Gävle
MEPs for Sweden 2019–2024
Moderate Party MEPs
LGBT members of the European Parliament